Jamie Grace Harper (born November 25, 1991) is an American contemporary Christian musician, singer, rapper, and songwriter from Atlanta, Georgia. In 2010, TobyMac found her songs on YouTube and signed her to his label Gotee Records for two albums. She released the song "Hold Me" in 2011 which landed her a nomination at the 2012 Grammys and won the 2012 Dove Award for New Artist of the Year.

Background 

Grace was born Jamie Grace Harper and is the youngest daughter to Bishop James Harper and Pastor Mona Harper. She grew up singing and playing instruments both at church and at home with her older sister Morgan. She was home-schooled with her sister.

On July 16, 2006, she created a YouTube account and began posting videos of her songs online.

Over the years her videos received recognition from Audio Adrenaline's Mark Stuart, David Mullen and eventually landing her a singing and acting gig with the television show iShine Knect, and subsequent tour. In 2010 she was discovered by TobyMac and signed to his record label Gotee Records later that year. 

Grace's debut EP, Hold Me, was released by the label on February 22, 2011. Jamie Grace released the title track to the album at the same time and it was one of the most added singles to Christian Hit Radio stations. Her debut album, One Song at a Time, was released in stores September 20, 2011. Her second EP, Christmas Together, was released November 29, 2011.

Grace was featured as a main artist and speaker in the Revolve Tour by Women of Faith alongside artists such as Britt Nicole, Group 1 Crew, and Hawk Nelson.

On May 4, 2011, Jesus Freak Hideout announced that "Hold Me," her first single, had attained the No. 1 spot at CHR.

Her second studio album, Ready to Fly, produced by Christopher Stevens and David Garcia, was released January 28, 2014. The first single was "Beautiful Day". The second single available was "Fighter", an inspiring song about those who have struggled but don't give up.

She was a part of the Winter Jam Tour 2015 West Coast.

In August 2016, Jamie Grace and her sister, fellow artist Morgan Harper Nichols, announced her departure from Gotee Records.

On November 25, 2016, Jamie Grace released "Party Like a Princess" to most major music streaming services, which was released as a promotional single for both her 25th birthday and her upcoming third studio album. In February 2017, Grace announced that the album would be delayed to allow Grace to address issues around her mother's health. On April 21, Grace released the lead single, The Happy Song, from the new album. On July 11, Grace, streaming live on YouTube, announced that the album would be titled '91, and would be released on September 1, 2017. Ten days later, on July 21, Grace posted the second single, Daughter of a King, on YouTube On September 1, 2017, the fourteen-track album was released. Shortly thereafter, she introduced a new project, '91 Anthems; a YouTube endeavor featuring 91 original songs and covers recorded inspired by stories submitted by fans. Since then, she has released another single, "Wait it Out", and is working on new music as well.

Musical style 

In a somewhat unusual style, Jamie Grace combines elements of hip hop, folk, and pop into one distinct sound. She occasionally uses elements of guest vocalists, such as TobyMac in "Hold Me" and GabeReal from DiverseCity in "One Song at a Time" on Hold Me.

Personal life 

Grace graduated from Point University with a bachelor's degree in children's ministry. She has Tourette syndrome and obsessive–compulsive disorder.

In 2016, she was called up onto the stage at an Adele concert. She then sang a cover of "I Can't Help Falling in Love With You" – originally sung by Elvis – and Adele said that she had a great voice.

On January 25, 2018, Grace announced that she had become engaged to Aaron Collins. The couple were married on April 14, 2018. They welcomed their first child, a daughter, Isabella Brave Harper Collins on June 7, 2019.

Discography

Albums

EPs

Singles 

"—" denotes releases that did not chart.

Album appearances 

 2011: tobyMac – Christmas in Diverse City;  "Mary's Boy Child"
 2012: Anthem Lights – The Acoustic Sessions;  "In the Light (Acoustic)"
 2012: Morgan Harper Nichols – Verge (single); "Verge"
 2012: tobyMac – Eye on It; "Favorite Song"
 2019: 1k Phew, Aaron Cole – What's Understood 2; "Glory"

Compilation contributions 

 2013: Colossal Coaster World (Lifeway's VBS); "Colossal Coaster World", "Change My Heart", and "I Will Trust in You".
 2012: It Happened One Night: Celebrating Christmas and Freedom Around the World; "Away in a Manger"
 2010: All Starz 2010; "Heads Up"

As Harper Still 

 2020: Show Love EP

Filmography

Awards and nominations

References

External links 

 
 

 

1991 births
21st-century American singers
American child singers
American performers of Christian hip hop music
Gotee Records artists
Living people
People with Tourette syndrome
Point University alumni
Rappers from Atlanta
Rappers from Los Angeles
African-American women rappers
21st-century American women singers
21st-century American rappers
Music YouTubers
YouTube vloggers
American YouTubers
American Idol participants
21st-century African-American women singers
21st-century women rappers